Elyasi may refer to:
 Elyasi, Kermanshah
 Elyasi-ye Ahmad, Kermanshah Province
 Elyasi-ye Khalifeh Hoseyn, Kermanshah Province
 Elyasi-ye Mahmud, Kermanshah Province
 Elyasi-ye Saleh Matta, Kermanshah Province
 Elyasi, West Azerbaijan